The Ross Valley School District is a public K-8 school district located 13 miles north of San Francisco, on the north side of Mount Tamalpais, in Marin County, California. The district serves students in San Anselmo and Fairfax.

Graduates of the middle school usually attend Sir Francis Drake High School, which is part of the Tamalpais Union High School District. The District is within the boundaries of the Marin Community College District.

Schools 
The district operates four elementary schools: Brookside, Hidden Valley, Manor, and Wade Thomas; and one middle school: White Hill.

References

External links 

 Mill Valley School District Boundaries Map
 Mill Valley School District Boundaries Description

School districts in Marin County, California
Mill Valley, California